SCIP may refer to:

Science and technology

 SCIP (optimization software); an optimization software for mixed-integer programs
 SCIP database; listing potentially hazardous waste and maintained by the European Chemicals Agency
 Secure Communications Interoperability Protocol; a cryptographic communication standard
 Surgical Care Improvement Project; a medical program in the US

Other uses
 Mataveri International Airport (ICAO airport code), on Easter Island, Chile
 Sindh Cities Improvement Program, a development program in Pakistan
 Strategic and Competitive Intelligence Professionals, formerly Society of Competitive Intelligence Professionals, a global nonprofit membership organization